Fanny Cottençon (born 11 May 1957) is a French actress, born in Port-Gentil, Gabon (then in French Equatorial Africa). In 1983 she won the César Award for Best Supporting Actress for her effort in the movie L'étoile du nord.

Select filmography

 1981 : Les Fourberies de Scapin as "Hyacinthe"
 1981 : Signé Furax as "Carole Hardy Petit"
 1982 : L'Étoile du Nord as "Sylvie Baron"
 1983 : L'Ami de Vincent as "Nathalie"
 1984 : Á coups de Crosse as "Fanny"
 1984 : Fanny Straw Hair 1985 : Monsieur de Pourceaugnac as "Julie"
 1985 :  as "Julie"
 1986 : Golden Eighties (dir. Chantal Akerman) as "Lili"
 1987 :  as "Martine"
 1988 : Gros cœurs as "Cléo Lemkowicz"
 1988 : À gauche en sortant de l'ascenseur as "Florence Arnaud"
 1991 : Les Clés du paradis as "Isabelle"
 1997 : Ça reste entre nous as "Agnès"
 1999 : Our Happy Lives 2001 : Change moi ma vie as "Nadine"
 2004 :  as "Luce Zagury"
 2006 : L'Enfant du secret by Serge Meynard as "Marie de l'Epée"
 2007 : Dialogue avec mon jardinier by Jean Becker
 2007 : Lost Signs (TV) as "Anne de Lestrade"
 2013 : Bright Days Ahead''

External links
 

1957 births
French people of Gabonese descent
French film actresses
French television actresses
Best Supporting Actress César Award winners
Living people
People from Ogooué-Maritime Province